Dorian Crossmond Missick (born January 15, 1976) is an American actor known for his role as Damian in the television series Six Degrees (2006) and for voicing Victor Vance in the video game Grand Theft Auto: Vice City Stories. He is also known for his starring role in the film Premium (2006) and his supporting roles in films such as The Manchurian Candidate (2004) and Lucky Number Slevin (2006).

Early life and education
Missick was born in East Orange, New Jersey, and grew up in North Plainfield, New Jersey.

Career
During his first acting class, casting agents were looking for a Coca-Cola commercial, and they decided that Missick was right for the part. He was later cast in a small role on In the Heat of the Night (1990), playing a young fisherman.

In the summer of 1996, Missick joined the Jazz Actors, a theater company in Harlem, where he studied under Ernie McClintock, whose jazz-influenced style strongly impacted Missick's in turn. After the company dispersed, Missick joined NITE Star, an educational company whose primary focus was to educate young teens on AIDS awareness and building an understanding towards alternative lifestyles. During his time with NITE Star, Missick met actress Kerry Washington (who was also involved with the company) and gained a steady income from commercials, averaging around seven nationals a year.

In 2002, Missick made his professional acting debut in Two Weeks Notice, playing Tony, Hugh Grant's right-hand man/limo driver. His exposure from that role led to parts in TV shows including NYPD Blue, Law & Order, Now and Again, and Buffy the Vampire Slayer, as well as small roles in movies such as Undermind, 50 Ways to Leave a Lover, A Message from Pops, Freedomland, and Two Guns. He auditioned for the role of Antwone Quenton 'Fish' Fisher in Antwone Fisher; he was not cast, but his meeting with Denzel Washington later led to a role in The Manchurian Candidate. Soon after, Missick got a role playing Elvis in Lucky Number Slevin, and soon afterward landed his first leading role in Premium alongside Zoe Saldana.

In 2018, he had a recurring role in the second season of the Netflix and Marvel Cinematic Universe series Luke Cage. Missick portrayed Dontrell "Cockroach" Hamilton, an ex-con previously locked up by Misty Knight, who is played by his real-life wife and series regular Simone Missick. In July 2018, he joined the main cast of the CBS All Access series Tell Me a Story as Sam.

Personal life
Missick married his wife, actress Simone Missick, in February 2012.

Filmography

Film

Television

Video games

References

External links

1970s births
Male actors from New Jersey
Living people
African-American male actors
Actors from East Orange, New Jersey
People from North Plainfield, New Jersey
American male film actors
American male television actors
American male video game actors
American male voice actors